Keith Weigel (born November 19, 1955) is an American politician in the state of Iowa.

Weigel was born in San Diego, California and attended University of Iowa. A Democrat, he served in the Iowa House of Representatives from 1993 to 2001 (30th district).

References

1955 births
Living people
Politicians from San Diego
University of Iowa alumni
Democratic Party members of the Iowa House of Representatives